Marinos Khristopoulos (born 22 November 1965) is a Greek bobsledder. He competed in the two man event at the 1994 Winter Olympics.

References

1965 births
Living people
Greek male bobsledders
Olympic bobsledders of Greece
Bobsledders at the 1994 Winter Olympics
Place of birth missing (living people)